is a former Japanese football player. His brother is Kenta Kawai.

Club statistics

References

External links

1979 births
Living people
Chukyo University alumni
Association football people from Ehime Prefecture
Japanese footballers
J2 League players
Japan Football League players
Ehime FC players
Association football defenders